is a 2008 novel by Keigo Higashino, the second in his Detective Galileo series. The English translation was published in 2012.

Plot
Yoshitaka Mashiba, who was about to leave his marriage and his wife, is poisoned by arsenic-laced coffee and dies.  His wife, Ayane, is the obvious suspect—but she was hundreds of miles away when he was murdered. The Police Detective Kusanagi refuses to believe that she could have had anything to do with the crime.  His assistant, Kaoru Utsumi, however, is convinced Ayane is guilty.  While Utsumi’s instincts tell her one thing, the facts of the case are another matter.  So she does what her boss has done for years when stymied—she calls upon Professor Manabu Yukawa.

2008 Japanese novels
Novels by Keigo Higashino
Japanese crime novels
Japanese mystery novels
Japanese detective novels
Japanese-language novels